is a former Japanese football player.

Playing career
Nakai was born in Takatsuki on January 4, 1983. He joined J1 League club Cerezo Osaka from youth team in 2001. He could not play at all in the match in 2001 and Cerezo was relegated to J2 League end of 2001 season. He debuted in April 2002 and played several matches as midfielder. Cerezo was also returned to J1 end of 2002 season. However he could hardly play in the match from 2003. In 2006, he moved to J2 club Thespa Kusatsu. He became a regular player as defensive midfielder soon and played many matches in 2006 season. However he could hardly play in the match in 2007 season. In July 2007, he moved to Japan Football League (JFL) club Sagawa Printing (later Sagawa Printing Kyoto, SP Kyoto FC). He became a regular player and played many matches until 2010. In 2011, he moved to JFL club V-Varen Nagasaki. He played as regular player in 2011. However he could not play many matches in 2012 season. Although V-Varen won the champions in 2012 season and was promoted to J2 from 2013, he left the club without playing J2. In 2013, he re-joined Sagawa Printing for the first time in 3 years. He played many matches until 2015. However the club was disbanded end of 2015 season and he retired end of 2015 season.

Club statistics

References

External links

1983 births
Living people
Association football people from Osaka Prefecture
People from Takatsuki, Osaka
Japanese footballers
J1 League players
J2 League players
Japan Football League players
Cerezo Osaka players
Thespakusatsu Gunma players
SP Kyoto FC players
V-Varen Nagasaki players
Association football midfielders